Niacin, also known as nicotinic acid, is an organic compound and a form of vitamin B3, an essential human nutrient. It can be manufactured by plants and animals from the amino acid tryptophan. Niacin is obtained in the diet from a variety of whole and processed foods, with highest contents in fortified packaged foods, meat, poultry, red fish such as tuna and salmon, lesser amounts in nuts, legumes and seeds. Niacin as a dietary supplement is used to treat pellagra, a disease caused by niacin deficiency. Signs and symptoms of pellagra include skin and mouth lesions, anemia, headaches, and tiredness. Many countries mandate its addition to wheat flour or other food grains, thereby reducing the risk of pellagra.

The amide derivative nicotinamide (niacinamide) is a component of the coenzymes nicotinamide adenine dinucleotide (NAD) and nicotinamide adenine dinucleotide phosphate (NADP+). Although niacin and nicotinamide are identical in their vitamin activity, nicotinamide does not have the same pharmacological, lipid-modifying effects or side effects as niacin, i.e., when niacin takes on the -amide group, it does not reduce cholesterol nor cause flushing. Nicotinamide is recommended as a treatment for niacin deficiency because it can be administered in remedial amounts without causing the flushing, considered an adverse effect.

Niacin is also a prescription medication. Amounts far in excess of the recommended dietary intake for vitamin functions will lower blood triglycerides and low density lipoprotein cholesterol (LDL-C), and raise blood high density lipoprotein cholesterol (HDL-C, often referred to as "good" cholesterol). There are two forms: immediate-release and sustained-release niacin. Initial prescription amounts are 500 mg/day, increased over time until a therapeutic effect is achieved. Immediate-release doses can be as high as 3,000 mg/day; sustained-release as high as 2,000 mg/day. Despite the proven lipid changes, niacin has not been found useful for decreasing the risk of cardiovascular disease in those already on a statin. A 2010 review had concluded that niacin was effective as a mono-therapy, but a 2017 review incorporating twice as many trials concluded that prescription niacin, while affecting lipid levels, did not reduce all-cause mortality, cardiovascular mortality, myocardial infarctions, nor fatal or non-fatal strokes. Prescription niacin was shown to cause hepatotoxicity and increase risk of type 2 diabetes. Niacin prescriptions in the U.S. had peaked in 2009, at 9.4million, declining to 800thousand by 2020.

Niacin has the formula  and belongs to the group of the pyridinecarboxylic acids. As the precursor for nicotinamide adenine dinucleotide and nicotinamide adenine dinucleotide phosphate, niacin is involved in DNA repair.

Definition
Niacin is both a vitamin, i.e., an essential nutrient, marketed as a dietary supplement, and in the US, a prescription medicine. As a vitamin, it is precursor of the coenzymes nicotinamide adenine dinucleotide (NAD) and nicotinamide adenine dinucleotide phosphate (NADP). These compounds are coenzymes for many dehydrogenases, participating in many hydrogen transfer processes. NAD is important in catabolism of fat, carbohydrate, protein, and alcohol, as well as cell signaling and DNA repair, and NADP mostly in anabolism reactions such as fatty acid and cholesterol synthesis. Vitamin intake recommendations made by several countries are that intakes of 14–18 mg/day are sufficient to meet the needs of healthy adults. Niacin or nicotinamide (niacinamide) are used for prevention and treatment of pellagra, a disease caused by lack of the vitamin. When niacin is used as a medicine to treat elevated cholesterol and triglycerides, daily doses range from 500 to 3,000 mg/day. High-dose nicotinamide does not have this medicinal effect.

Vitamin deficiency

Severe deficiency of niacin in the diet causes the disease pellagra, characterized by diarrhea, sun-sensitive dermatitis involving hyperpigmentation and thickening of the skin (see image), inflammation of the mouth and tongue, delirium, dementia, and if left untreated, death. Common psychiatric symptoms include irritability, poor concentration, anxiety, fatigue, loss of memory, restlessness, apathy, and depression. The biochemical mechanism(s) for the observed deficiency-caused neurodegeneration are not well understood, but may rest on: A) the requirement for nicotinamide adenine dinucleotide (NAD+) to suppress the creation of neurotoxic tryptophan metabolites, B) inhibition of mitochondrial ATP generation, resulting in cell damage; C), activation of the poly (ADP-ribose) polymerase (PARP) pathway, as PARP is a nuclear enzyme involved in DNA repair, but in the absence of NAD+ can lead to cell death; D) reduced synthesis of neuro-protective brain-derived neurotrophic factor or its receptor tropomyosin receptor kinase B; or E) changes to genome expression directly due to the niacin deficiency.

Niacin deficiency is rarely seen in developed countries, and it is more typically associated with poverty, malnutrition or malnutrition secondary to chronic alcoholism. It also tends to occur in less developed areas where people eat maize (corn) as a staple food, as maize is the only grain low in digestible niacin. A cooking technique called nixtamalization i.e., pretreating with alkali ingredients, increases the bioavailability of niacin during maize meal/flour production. For this reason, people who consume corn as tortillas or hominy are at less risk of niacin deficiency.

For treating deficiency, the World Health Organization (WHO) recommends administering niacinamide i.e., nicotinamide, instead of niacin, to avoid the flushing side effect commonly caused by the latter. Guidelines suggest using 300 mg/day for three to four weeks. Dementia and dermatitis show improvement within a week. Because deficiencies of other B-vitamins may be present, the WHO recommends a multi-vitamin in addition to the niacinamide.

Hartnup disease is a hereditary nutritional disorder resulting in niacin deficiency. It is named after an English family with a genetic disorder that resulted in a failure to absorb the essential amino acid tryptophan, tryptophan being a precursor for niacin synthesis. The symptoms are similar to pellagra, including red, scaly rash and sensitivity to sunlight. Oral niacin or niacinamide is given as a treatment for this condition in doses ranging from 50 to 100 mg twice a day, with a good prognosis if identified and treated early. Niacin synthesis is also deficient in carcinoid syndrome, because of metabolic diversion of its precursor tryptophan to form serotonin.

Measuring vitamin status
Plasma concentrations of niacin and niacin metabolites are not useful markers of niacin status. Urinary excretion of the methylated metabolite N1-methyl-nicotinamide is considered reliable and sensitive. The measurement requires a 24-hour urine collection. For adults, a value of less than 5.8 μmol/day represent deficient niacin status and 5.8 to 17.5 μmol/day represents low. According to the World Health Organization, an alternative mean of expressing urinary N1-methyl-nicotinamide is as mg/g creatinine in a 24-hour urine collection, with deficient defined as <0.5, low 0.5-1.59, acceptable 1.6-4.29, and high >4.3 Niacin deficiency occurs before the signs and symptoms of pellagra appear. Erythrocyte nicotinamide adenine dinucleotide (NAD) concentrations potentially provide another sensitive indicator of niacin depletion, although definitions of deficient, low and adequate have not been established. Lastly, plasma tryptophan decreases on a low niacin diet because tryptophan converts to niacin. However, low tryptophan could also be caused by a diet low in this essential amino acid, so it is not specific to confirming vitamin status.

Dietary recommendations

The U.S. Institute of Medicine (renamed National Academy of Medicine in 2015) updated Estimated Average Requirements (EARs) and Recommended Dietary Allowances (RDAs) for niacin in 1998, also Tolerable upper intake levels (ULs). In lieu of an RDA, Adequate Intakes (AIs) are identified for populations for which there is not sufficient evidence to identify a dietary intake level that is sufficient to meet the nutrient requirements of most people. (see table).

The European Food Safety Authority (EFSA) refers to the collective set of information as Dietary Reference Values (DRV), with Population Reference Intake (PRI) instead of RDA, and Average Requirement instead of EAR. For the EU, AIs and ULs have the same definition as in the US, except that units are milligrams per megajoule (MJ) of energy consumed rather than mg/day. For women (including those pregnant or lactating), men and children the PRI is 1.6 mg per megajoule. As the conversion is 1 MJ = 239 kcal, an adult consuming 2390 kilocalories should be consuming 16 mg niacin. This is comparable to US RDAs (14 mg/day for adult women, 16 mg/day for adult men).

ULs are established by identifying amounts of vitamins and minerals that cause adverse effects, and then selecting as an upper limit amounts that are the "maximum daily intake unlikely to cause adverse health effects." Regulatory agencies from different countries do not always agree. For the US, 30 or 35 mg for teenagers and adults, less for children. The EFSA UL for adults is set at 10 mg/day - about one-third of the US value. For all of the government ULs, the term applies to niacin as a supplement consumed as one dose, and is intended as a limit to avoid the skin flush reaction. This explains why for EFSA, the recommended daily intake can be higher than the UL.

Both the DRI and DRV describe amounts needed as niacin equivalents (NE), calculated as 1 mg NE = 1 mg niacin or 60 mg of the essential amino acid tryptophan. This is because the amino acid is utilized to synthesize the vitamin.

For U.S. food and dietary supplement labeling purposes the amount in a serving is expressed as a percent of Daily Value (%DV). For niacin labeling purposes 100% of the Daily Value is 16 mg. Prior to 27 May 2016 it was 20 mg, revised to bring it into agreement with the RDA. 
Compliance with the updated labeling regulations was required by 1 January 2020 for manufacturers with US$10 million or more in annual food sales, and by 1 January 2021 for manufacturers with lower volume food sales. A table of the old and new adult daily values is provided at Reference Daily Intake.

Sources
Niacin is found in a variety of whole and processed foods, including fortified packaged foods, meat from various animal sources, seafoods, and spices. In general, animal-sourced foods provide about 5–10 mg niacin per serving, although dairy foods and eggs have little. Some plant-sourced foods such as nuts, legumes and grains provide about 2–5 mg niacin per serving, although in some grain products this naturally present niacin is largely bound to polysaccharides and glycopeptides, making it only about 30% bioavailable. Fortified food ingredients such as wheat flour have niacin added, which is bioavailable. Among whole food sources with the highest niacin content per 100 grams:

Vegetarian and vegan diets can provide adequate amounts if products such as nutritional yeast, peanuts, peanut butter, tahini, brown rice, mushrooms, avocado and sunflower seeds are included. Fortified foods and dietary supplements can also be consumed to ensure adequate intake.

Food preparation
Niacin naturally found in food is susceptible to destruction from high heat cooking, especially in the presence of acidic foods and sauces. It is soluble in water, and so may also be lost from foods boiled in water.

Food fortification
Countries fortify foods with nutrients to address known deficiencies. As of 2020, 54 countries required food fortification of wheat flour with niacin or niacinamide; 14 also mandate fortification of maize flour, and 6 mandate fortification of rice. From country to country, niacin fortification ranges from 1.3 to 6.0 mg/100 g.

As a dietary supplement
In the United States, niacin is sold as a non-prescription dietary supplement with a range of 100 to 1000 mg per serving. These products often have a Structure/Function health claim allowed by the US Food & Drug Administration (FDA). An example would be "Supports a healthy blood lipid profile." The American Heart Association strongly advises against the substitution of dietary supplement niacin for prescription niacin because of potentially serious side effects, which means that niacin should only be used under the supervision of a health care professional, and because manufacture of dietary supplement niacin is not as well-regulated by the FDA as prescription niacin. More than 30 mg niacin consumed as a dietary supplement can cause skin flushing. Face, arms and chest skin turns a reddish color because of vasodilation of small subcutaneous blood vessels, accompanied by sensations of heat, tingling and itching. These signs and symptoms are typically transient, lasting minutes to hours; they are considered unpleasant rather than toxic.

As lipid-modifying medication
In the United States, prescription niacin, in immediate-release and slow-release forms, is used to treat primary hyperlipidemia and hypertriglyceridemia. It is used either as a monotherapy or in combination with other lipid-modifying drugs. Dosages start at 500 mg/day and are often gradually increased to as high as 3000 mg/day for immediate release or 2000 mg/day for slow release (also referred to as sustained release) to achieve the targeted lipid changes (lower LDL-C and triglycerides, and higher HDL-C). Prescriptions in the US peaked in 2009, at 9.4million and had declined to 800thousand by 2020.

Systematic reviews found no effect of prescription niacin on all-cause mortality, cardiovascular mortality, myocardial infarctions, nor fatal or non-fatal strokes despite raising HDL cholesterol. Reported side effects include an increased risk of new-onset type 2 diabetes.

Mechanisms
Niacin reduces synthesis of low-density lipoprotein cholesterol (LDL-C), very low-density lipoprotein cholesterol (VLDL-C), lipoprotein(a) and triglycerides, and increases high-density lipoprotein cholesterol (HDL-C). The lipid-therapeutic effects of niacin are partly mediated through the activation of G protein-coupled receptors, including hydroxycarboxylic acid receptor 2 (HCA2)and hydroxycarboxylic acid receptor 3 (HCA3), which are highly expressed in body fat. HCA2 and HCA3 inhibit cyclic adenosine monophosphate (cAMP) production and thus suppress the release of free fatty acids (FFAs) from body fat, reducing their availability to the liver to synthesize the blood-circulating lipids in question. A decrease in free fatty acids also suppresses liver expression of apolipoprotein C3 and PPARg coactivator-1b, thus increasing VLDL-C turnover and reducing its production. Niacin also directly inhibits the action of diacylglycerol O-acyltransferase 2 (DGAT2) a key enzyme for triglyceride synthesis.

The mechanism behind niacin increasing HDL-C is not totally understood, but seems to occur in various ways. Niacin increases apolipoprotein A1 levels by inhibiting the breakdown of this protein, which is a component of HDL-C. It also inhibits HDL-C hepatic uptake by suppressing production of the cholesterol ester transfer protein (CETP) gene. It stimulates the ABCA1 transporter in monocytes and macrophages and upregulates peroxisome proliferator-activated receptor gamma, resulting in reverse cholesterol transport.

Combined with statins
Extended release niacin was combined with lovastatin (Advicor), and with simvastatin (Simcor), as prescription drug combinations. The combination niacin/lovastatin was approved by the U.S. Food and Drug Administration (FDA) in 2001. The combination niacin/simvastatin was approved by the FDA in 2008. Subsequently, large outcome trials using these niacin and statin therapies were unable to demonstrate incremental benefit of niacin beyond statin therapy alone. The FDA withdrew approval of both drugs in 2016. The reason given: "Based on the collective evidence from several large cardiovascular outcome trials, the Agency has concluded that the totality of the scientific evidence no longer supports the conclusion that a drug-induced reduction in triglyceride levels and/or increase in HDL-cholesterol levels in statin-treated patients results in a reduction in the risk of cardiovascular events." The drug company discontinued the drugs.

Contraindications
Prescription immediate release (Niacor) and extended release (Niaspan) niacin are contraindicated for people with either active or a history of liver disease because both, but especially Niaspan, have been associated with instances of serious, on occasion fatal, liver failure. Both products are contraindicated for people with existing peptic ulcer disease, or other bleeding problems because niacin lowers platelet count and interferes with blood clotting. Both products are also contraindicated for women who are pregnant or expecting to become pregnant because safety during pregnancy has not been evaluated in human trials. These products are contraindicated for women who are lactating because it is known that niacin is excreted into human milk, but the amount and potential for adverse effects in the nursing infant are not known. Women are advised to either not nurse their child or discontinue the drug. High-dose niacin has not been tested or approved for use in children under 16 years.

Adverse effects
The most common adverse effects of medicinal niacin are flushing (e.g., warmth, redness, itching or tingling) of the face, neck and chest, headache, abdominal pain, diarrhea, dyspepsia, nausea, vomiting, rhinitis, pruritus and rash. These can be minimized by initiating therapy at low dosages, increasing dosage gradually, and avoiding administration on an empty stomach.

The acute adverse effects of high-dose niacin therapy – which is commonly used in the treatment of hyperlipidemias – can further include hypotension, fatigue, glucose intolerance and insulin resistance, heartburn, blurred or impaired vision, and macular edema. With long-term use, the adverse effects of high-dose niacin therapy (750 mg per day) also include liver failure (associated with fatigue, nausea, and loss of appetite), hepatitis, and acute liver failure; these hepatotoxic effects of niacin occur more often when extended-release dosage forms are used. The long-term use of niacin at greater than or equal to 2 grams per day also significantly increases the risk of cerebral hemorrhage, ischemic stroke, gastrointestinal ulceration and bleeding, diabetes, dyspepsia, and diarrhea.

Flushing
Flushing – a short-term dilatation of skin arterioles, causing reddish skin color – usually lasts for about 15 to 30 minutes, although sometimes can persist for weeks. Typically, the face is affected, but the reaction can extend to neck and upper chest. The cause is blood vessel dilation due to elevation in prostaglandin GD2 (PGD2) and serotonin. Flushing was often thought to involve histamine, but histamine has been shown not to be involved in the reaction. Flushing is sometimes accompanied by a prickly or itching sensation, in particular, in areas covered by clothing.

Prevention of flushing requires altering or blocking the prostaglandin-mediated pathway. Aspirin taken half an hour before the niacin prevents flushing, as does ibuprofen. Taking niacin with meals also helps reduce this side effect. Acquired tolerance will also help reduce flushing; after several weeks of a consistent dose, most people no longer experience flushing. Slow- or "sustained"-release forms of niacin have been developed to lessen these side effects.

Liver damage
Niacin in medicinal doses can cause modest elevations in serum transaminase and unconjugated bilirubin, both biomarkers of liver injury. The increases usually resolve even when drug intake is continued. However, less commonly, the sustained release form of the drug can lead to serious hepatotoxicity, with onset in days to weeks. Early symptoms of serious liver damage include nausea, vomiting and abdominal pain, followed by jaundice and pruritus. The mechanism is thought to be a direct toxicity of elevated serum niacin. Lowering dose or switching to the immediate release form can resolve symptoms. In rare instances the injury is severe, and progresses to liver failure.

Diabetes
The high doses of niacin used to treat hyperlipidemia have been shown to elevate fasting blood glucose in people with type 2 diabetes. Long-term niacin therapy was also associated with an increase in the risk of new-onset type 2 diabetes.

Other adverse effects
High doses of niacin can also cause niacin maculopathy, a thickening of the macula and retina, which leads to blurred vision and blindness. This maculopathy is reversible after niacin intake ceases. Niaspan, the slow-release product, has been associated with a reduction in platelet content and a modest increase in prothrombin time.

Pharmacology

Pharmacodynamics
Activating HCA2 has effects other than lowering serum cholesterol and triglyceride concentrations: antioxidative, anti-inflammatory, antithrombotic, improved endothelial function and plaque stability, all of which counter development and progression of atherosclerosis.

Niacin inhibits cytochrome P450 enzymes CYP2E1, CYP2D6 and CYP3A4. Niacin produces a rise in serum unconjugated bilirubin in normal individuals and in those with Gilbert's Syndrome. However, in the Gilbert's Syndrome, the rise in bilirubin is higher and clearance is delayed longer than in normal people. One test used to aid in diagnosing Gilbert's Syndrome involves intravenous administration of nicotinic acid (niacin) in a dose of 50 mg over a period of 30 seconds.

Pharmacokinetics
Both niacin and niacinamide are rapidly absorbed from the stomach and small intestine. Absorption is facilitated by sodium-dependent diffusion, and at higher intakes, via passive diffusion. Unlike some other vitamins, the percent absorbed does not decrease with increasing dose, so that even at amounts of 3-4 grams, absorption is nearly complete. With a one gram dose, peak plasma concentrations of 15 to 30 μg/mL are reached within 30 to 60 minutes. Approximately 88% of an oral pharmacologic dose is eliminated by the kidneys as unchanged niacin or nicotinuric acid, its primary metabolite. The plasma elimination half-life of niacin ranges from 20 to 45 minutes.

Niacin and nicotinamide are both converted into the coenzyme NAD. NAD converts to NADP by phosphorylation in the presence of the enzyme NAD+ kinase.  High energy requirements (brain) or high turnover rate (gut, skin) organs are usually the most susceptible to their deficiency. In the liver, niacinamide is converted to storage nicotinamide adenine dinucleotide (NAD). As needed, liver NAD is hydrolyzed to niacinamide and niacin for transport to tissues, there reconverted to NAD to serve as an enzyme cofactor. Excess niacin is methylated in the liver to N1-methylnicotinamide (NMN) and excreted in urine as such or as the oxidized metabolite N1-methyl-2-pyridone-5-carboxamide (2-pyridone). Decreased urinary content of these metabolites is a measure of niacin deficiency.

Production

Biosynthesis
In addition to absorbing niacin from diet, niacin can be synthesized from the essential amino acid tryptophan, a five-step process with the penultimate compound being quinolinic acid (see figure). Some bacteria and plants utilize aspartic acid in a pathway that also goes to quinolinic acid. For humans, the efficiency of conversion is estimated as requiring 60mg of tryptophan to make 1mg of niacin. Riboflavin, vitamin B6 and iron are required for the process. Pellagra is a consequence of a corn-dominant diet because the niacin in corn is poorly bioavailable and corn proteins are low in tryptophan compared to wheat and rice proteins.

Industrial synthesis
Nicotinic acid was first synthesized in 1867 by oxidative degradation of nicotine. Niacin is prepared by hydrolysis of nicotinonitrile, which, as described above, is generated by oxidation of 3-picoline. Oxidation can be effected by air, but ammoxidation is more efficient. In the latter process, nicotinonitrile is produced by ammoxidation of 3-methylpyridine. Nitrile hydratase is then used to catalyze nicotinonitrile to nicotinamide, which can be converted to niacin. Alternatively, ammonia, acetic acid and paraldehyde are used to make 5-ethyl-2-methyl-pyridine, which is then oxidized to niacin. New "greener" catalysts are being tested using manganese-substituted aluminophosphates that use acetyl peroxyborate as non-corrosive oxidant, avoiding producing nitrogen oxides as do traditional ammoxidations.

The demand for commercial production includes for animal feed and for food fortification meant for human consumption. According to Ullmann's Encyclopedia of Industrial Chemistry, worldwide 31,000 tons of nicotinamide were sold in 2014.

Chemistry
This colorless, water-soluble solid is a derivative of pyridine, with a carboxyl group (COOH) at the 3-position. Other forms of vitamin B3 include the corresponding amide nicotinamide (niacinamide), where the carboxyl group has been replaced by a carboxamide group.

Preparations
Niacin is incorporated into multi-vitamin and sold as a single-ingredient dietary supplement. The latter can be immediate or slow release.

Nicotinamide (niacinamide) is used to treat niacin deficiency because it does not cause the flushing adverse reaction seen with niacin. Nicotinamide may be toxic to the liver at doses exceeding 3g/day for adults.

Prescription products can be immediate release (Niacor, 500 mg tablets) or extended release (Niaspan, 500 and 1000 mg tablets). Niaspan has a film coating that delays release of the niacin, resulting in an absorption over a period of 8–12 hours. This reduces vasodilation and flushing side effects, but increases the risk of hepatotoxicity compared to the immediate release drug.

Prescription niacin preparations in combination with statin drugs (discontinued) are described above. A combination of niacin and laropiprant had been approved for use in Europe and marketed as Tredaptive. Laropiprant is a prostaglandin D2 binding drug shown to reduce niacin-induced vasodilation and flushing side effects. A clinical trial showed no additional efficacy of Tredaptive in lowering cholesterol when used together with other statin drugs, but did show an increase in other side effects. The study resulted in the withdrawal of Tredaptive from the international market.

One form of dietary supplement sold in the US is inositol hexanicotinate (IHN), also called inositol nicotinate. This is inositol that has been esterified with niacin on all six of inositol's alcohol groups. IHN is usually sold as "flush-free" or "no-flush" niacin in units of 250, 500, or 1000 mg/tablets or capsules. In the US, it is sold as an over-the-counter formulation, and often is marketed and labeled as niacin, thus misleading consumers into thinking they are getting an active form of the medication. While this form of niacin does not cause the flushing associated with the immediate-release products, there is not enough evidence to recommend IHN to treat hyperlipidemia.

History

Niacin as a chemical compound was first described by chemist Hugo Weidel in 1873 in his studies of nicotine, but that predated by many years the concept of food components other than protein, fat and carbohydrates that were essential for life. Vitamin nomenclature was initially alphabetical, with Elmer McCollum calling these fat-soluble A and water-soluble B. Over time, eight chemically distinct, water-soluble B vitamins were isolated and numbered, with niacin as vitamin B3.

Corn (maize) became a staple food in the southeast United States and in parts of Europe. A disease that was characterized by dermatitis of sunlight-exposed skin was described in Spain in 1735 by Gaspar Casal. He attributed the cause to poor diet. In northern Italy it was named "pellagra" from the Lombard language (agra = holly-like or serum-like; pell = skin). In time, the disease was more closely linked specifically to corn. In the US, Joseph Goldberger was assigned to study pellagra by the Surgeon General of the United States. His studies confirmed a corn-based diet as the culprit, but he did not identify the root cause.

Nicotinic acid was extracted from liver by biochemist Conrad Elvehjem in 1937. He later identified the active ingredient, referring to it as "pellagra-preventing factor" and the "anti-blacktongue factor." It was also referred to as "vitamin PP", "vitamin P-P" and "PP-factor", all derived from the term "pellagra-preventive factor". In the late 1930s, studies by Tom Douglas Spies, Marion Blankenhorn, and Clark Cooper confirmed that niacin cured pellagra in humans. The prevalence of the disease was greatly reduced as a result.

In 1942, when flour enrichment with nicotinic acid began, a headline in the popular press said "Tobacco in Your Bread." In response, the Council on Foods and Nutrition of the American Medical Association approved of the Food and Nutrition Board's new names niacin and niacin amide for use primarily by non-scientists. It was thought appropriate to choose a name to dissociate nicotinic acid from nicotine, to avoid the perception that vitamins or niacin-rich food contains nicotine, or that cigarettes contain vitamins. The resulting name niacin was derived from cotinic id + vitam. 

Carpenter found in 1951, that niacin in corn is biologically unavailable, and can be released only in very alkaline lime water of pH 11. This explains why a Latin-American culture that used alkali-treated cornmeal to make tortilla was not at risk for niacin deficiency.

In 1955, Altschul and colleagues described large amounts of niacin as having a lipid-lowering property. As such, niacin is the oldest known lipid-lowering drug. Lovastatin, the first 'statin' drug, was first marketed in 1987.

Research

In animal models and in vitro, niacin produces marked anti-inflammatory effects in a variety of tissues – including the brain, gastrointestinal tract, skin, and vascular tissue – through the activation of hydroxycarboxylic acid receptor 2 (HCA2), also known as niacin receptor 1 (NIACR1). Unlike niacin, nicotinamide does not activate NIACR1; however, both niacin and nicotinamide activate the G protein-coupled estrogen receptor (GPER) in vitro.

References

External links 
 

AbbVie brands
Aromatic acids
B vitamins
CYP2D6 inhibitors
CYP3A4 inhibitors
GABAA receptor positive allosteric modulators
GPER agonists
Hypolipidemic agents
3-Pyridyl compounds
X